Kelly Jones won in the final 6–1, 7–5 against Amos Mansdorf.

Seeds
A champion seed is indicated in bold text while text in italics indicates the round in which that seed was eliminated.

  Kevin Curren (semifinals)
  Amos Mansdorf (final)
  John Fitzgerald (first round)
  Wally Masur (semifinals)
  Milan Šrejber (first round)
  Richard Matuszewski (first round)
  Jim Pugh (quarterfinals)
  Kelly Evernden (quarterfinals)

Draw

External links

Singapore singles
Singapore Open (men's tennis)
1989 in Singaporean sport